John Raymond Henry (August 11, 1943 – November 1, 2022) was an American sculptor. Henry's sculpture has been described as huge welded steel drawings.

Education and distinctions

Henry was born in Lexington, Kentucky, in 1943. He received his BFA from School of the Art Institute of Chicago in 1969. From 1978–80, he was President and Chairman of ConStruct. Henry also studied at the Illinois Institute of Technology, the University of Chicago, and Northwestern University. In 1996, the University of Kentucky awarded him the Honorary Doctor of Arts. From 2001–02, he was Chairman of the International Sculpture Center. Henry died at home on November 1, 2022, in Brooksville, Florida.

Recognition
2003 Kentucky Governor's National Award.
2004 Mayor's Award of Distinction in the Arts in City of Chattanooga.

References

1943 births
2022 deaths
American male sculptors
School of the Art Institute of Chicago alumni
Artists from Lexington, Kentucky
Sculptors from Kentucky
20th-century American sculptors
20th-century American male artists
21st-century American sculptors
21st-century American male artists